Rud Bardeh (also Romanized as Rūd Bardeh, Rood Bardeh, and Rūdbordeh; also known as Rudburde) is a village in Sangar Rural District, Sangar District, Rasht County, Gilan Province, Iran. At the 2006 census, its population was 2,563, in 715 families.

References 

Populated places in Rasht County